In the doubles matches of the 2000 Idea Prokom Open, Laura Montalvo and Paola Suárez were the defending champions, but competed this year with different partners. Montalvo teamed up with Gala León García and were eliminated in quarterfinals. Suárez teamed up with Virginia Ruano Pascual and successfully defended her title, by defeating Åsa Carlsson and Rita Grande 7–5, 6–1 in the final.

Seeds

Draw

Draw

References

 Official results archive (ITF)
 Official results archive (WTA)

Women's Doubles
Doubles